The men's 10 km sprint biathlon competition of the Pyeongchang 2018 Olympics was held on 11 February 2018 at the Alpensia Biathlon Centre in Pyeongchang, South Korea. The event was won by Arnd Peiffer, with Michal Krčmář taking silver and Dominik Windisch bronze. This was the first individual Olympic medal for both Peiffer and Windisch, whereas for Krčmář, this was the first Olympic medal.

Summary
The 2014 champion, Ole Einar Bjørndalen, did not qualify for the event, and only the silver medalist, Dominik Landertinger, was competing. The field also included the 2010 silver, Emil Hegle Svendsen, and bronze, Jakov Fak, medalists. None of them were in medal contention during the event.

The early leader was Julian Eberhard, whose result was first improved by Peiffer. Krčmář finished second, and subsequently Windisch third, moving Eberhard down to fourth. Only four of the 87 competitors did not miss any targets, including the top two, Peiffer and Krčmář.

In the victory ceremony the day after, the medals were presented by Irena Szewińska, member of the International Olympic Committee, accompanied by James Carrabre, IBU Vice President of Medical Issues.

Qualification

Schedule
All times are (UTC+9).

Results
The race was started at 20:15.

References

Sprint